South Surma, also known as Dakshin Surma, is an upazila of Sylhet District in the Division of Sylhet, Bangladesh.

History

After the Conquest of Gour in 1303, many disciples of Shah Jalal settled in the Jalalpur, Godhrail and Renga parganas in modern-day South Surma where they would preach Islam to the local people. Shah Sheikh Mir Afzal Khandakar migrated to the village of Mirargaon, Shah Kamal Pahlawan Yemeni, Shah Moinuddin and Shah Jawharuddin to Maqamduar, Sheikh Jalal Shah Milon, Shah Muhammad Taqiuddin and Shah Sheikh Fathuddin to Jalalpur, Sheikh Farid Ansari and Sheikh Shah Sikandar to Lalabazar, Makhdum Zafar Sheikh Ghaznawi to Muhammadpur (Godhrail), Khwaja Taif Salim to Silam (Godhrail), Shah Sheikh Rahimuddin Ansari to Purbobhag (Jalalpur), Syed Qutbuddin Sheikh and Syed Jalaluddin Sheikh to Bungigram (Godhrail), Sayyid Zakir Shah Fatimi Makki to Turukkhola (Renga) and Shah Sheikh Daud Qureshi to Daudpur (Renga).

In 1888, the Jalalia Senior Fazil Madrasa was established. During the Bangladesh Liberation War, the Pakistani army reached Dakshin Surma (Sector 4) on 29 March 1971.

On the 91st meeting of NICAR held on 29 January 2005, 9 unions of Sylhet Sadar were decided to form a new administrative upazila. Dakshin Surma Upazila was formed with the powers conferred by Section 3 (2) of the Upazila Parishad Act, 1996. On 30 June 2011, the Kamalbazar Union Parishad was established taking some land from the Mogla Bazar and Tetli unions.

Dakshin Surma Thana and Moglabazar Thana have been created under the Sylhet Metropolitan Police in the interest of maintaining law and order situation in the upazila and maintaining peace and order among the people. Due to its location at a distance of only 09 km from Sylhet district, the office of the Divisional Commissioner, Office of the DIG Sylhet Range, Sylhet Education Board Building, Technical Women's Training Center and offices of all the departmental level government institutions are located in this upazila. This newly created upazila is located in Moglabazar Union.

Administration

The following are the nine unions in South Surma.

(Statistics shown here is based on the Bangladesh Population Census of 2011 by the Bangladesh Bureau of Statistics.)

Points of interest 
There are many popular places to visit in Dakshin Surma.  Qadipur Jame Masjid in Jalalpur, Turukkhola Islamia Balika Alim Madrashah in Daudpur, Hayat Muhammad Turukkhola Jame Masjid (Boro Masjid) in Daudpur, Jamia Towakkulia Renga Madrasha in Moglabazar and Chapra Beel in Tetli are popular tourist sites.

Notable people 
Abdul Jalil Choudhury, Islamic scholar and member of Assam Legislative Assembly for 27 years
Abdul Muktadir, geologist and lecturer martyred during the 1971 Dhaka University massacre
Abdul Malik, first cardiologist of Pakistan and National Professor of Bangladesh
Shafi Ahmed Chowdhury Qureshi, businessman, politician
Abdul Mukit Khan, politician
Dilwar Khan, poet
Khandaker Abdul Malik, politician
Mahbub Ali Khan, rear admiral and former Chief of Naval Staff (Bangladesh)

References

 
Upazilas of Sylhet District